Qaraozek, Karaozek, or also Karauzyak (Karakalpak: Қараөзек, Qaraózek) is a town and seat of Qaraozek district in Karakalpakstan in Uzbekistan. The town population in 1989 was 10,656 people.

References

Populated places in Karakalpakstan
Urban-type settlements in Uzbekistan